Spintharus of Corinth was an ancient Greek architect. Pausanias reported in his Descriptions of Greece  that the Alcmaeonids hired him to build a temple at Delphi. This is the only record of Spintharus. The temple to Apollo at Delphi had to be rebuilt after a fire in 548 BC and again after an earthquake in 373 BC. Historians have offered competing claims as to which temple Spintharus constructed.

Debate on chronology
J. B. Bury argued he built the 6th century temple because of accounts saying the fourth century temple was built by Xenodorus. John Henry Middleton dated Spintharus's construction to the latter half of the sixth century, BC. Karl Julius Sillig wrote Spintharus lived around the time of the 60th Olympiad, i.e., 540 BC.

However, James George Frazer argued he built the fourth century temple. He notes that Xenodorus is inscribed as the fourth century architect, but suggests Spintharus planned and began construction and Xenodorus continued construction after his death. Janina K. Darling reports Spintharus began construction in 346 BC and after his death the project was completed by the architects Xenodorus and Agathon. Hélène Perdicoyianni-Paléologou also lists all three architects as working on the rebuilding of the temple, which was completed in 320 BC. William Bell Dinsmoor notes that expense reports suggest that Xenodorus and Agathon continued Spintharus' construction on the fourth century temple.

Other possible works

Middleton also suggested Spintharus also built the temple at Corinth due to similarities in some of the details such as the hypotrachelia.

See also
 Ancient Greek architecture
 List of Ancient Greek temples

Notes

References

Further reading

 
 
 
  [English summary: ]
 

Ancient Greek architects
Ancient Corinthians
4th-century BC Greek people